Lalkuthi (or Lal Kothi) is a 1978 Hindi & Bengali Bilingual Thriller film directed by Kanak Mukherjee.

The Original Music was by Sapan Jagmohan.

Cast
Ranjit Mallick
Tanuja
Utpal Dutt
Danny Denzongpa   
Anil Dhawan

Soundtrack 
Hindi (Lal Kothi)

Bengali (Lalkuthi) 

All lyrics were written by Mukul Dutt. The songs are:

1. Tare Bholano Gelo Na (sung by Asha Bhosle)

2. Dhole Jete Jete (sung by Asha Bhosle and Kishore Kumar)

3. Karo Keu Noiko Ami (sung by Kishore Kumar and Nabanita)

4. Ke Jaay Re (sung by Asha Bhosle)

5. Karo Keu Noiko Ami- Sad version (sung by Kishore Kumar)

References

External links
 

1978 films
Indian multilingual films
1970s Hindi-language films
Bengali-language Indian films
1970s Bengali-language films
Films scored by Sapan-Jagmohan